Paolo Caldarella (20 September 1964 – 27 September 1993) was an Italian water polo player who competed in the 1988 Summer Olympics and in the 1992 Summer Olympics.

See also
 Italy men's Olympic water polo team records and statistics
 List of Olympic champions in men's water polo
 List of Olympic medalists in water polo (men)
 List of World Aquatics Championships medalists in water polo

References

External links
 

1964 births
1993 deaths
Italian male water polo players
Olympic water polo players of Italy
Water polo players at the 1988 Summer Olympics
Water polo players at the 1992 Summer Olympics
Olympic gold medalists for Italy
Olympic medalists in water polo
Medalists at the 1992 Summer Olympics
Road incident deaths in Italy
Sportspeople from Milan
20th-century Italian people